Prior to the abdication of Bảo Đại on 30 August 1945 in the aftermath of the August Revolution, Vietnam was ruled by a series of dynasties of either local or Chinese origin. The following is a list of major dynasties in the history of Vietnam.

Background

Naming convention
In Vietnamese historiography, dynasties are generally known to historians by the family name of the monarchs. For example, the Đinh dynasty is known as such because the ruling clan bore the family name .

However, as it was common for several dynasties to share the same official name, referring to regimes by their official name in historiography would be potentially confusing. For instance, the  "" was used by the Lý dynasty (since the reign of Lý Thánh Tông), the Trần dynasty, the Later Trần dynasty, the Later Lê dynasty, the Mạc dynasty, and the Tây Sơn dynasty.

In the Vietnamese language, the word for "dynasty" may be written as either  or  depending on the context. The former is generally used to denote the ruling family whereas the latter refers to the dynastic regime. For instance, the Mạc dynasty can be rendered as "" or "".

Origin of dynasties
Apart from over one millennium of direct Chinese rule, Vietnam was ruled by a series of "local" dynasties, although some of which could have their origins traced to China.

The founder of the legendary Hồng Bàng dynasty, Lộc Tục, was recorded as a descendant of the mythical Chinese ruler Shennong.

According to two historical Vietnamese texts, the Complete Annals of Đại Việt and the Imperially-commissioned Annotated Text Reflecting the Complete History of Việt, Thục Phán of the Thục dynasty was from Sichuan, China, which was previously under the rule of the ancient Chinese State of Shu.

The Triệu dynasty, established by Zhao Tuo from the Chinese Qin dynasty, was considered an orthodox local regime by traditional Vietnamese historiography. However, modern Vietnamese historians generally regard the Triệu dynasty to be a foreign regime that ruled Vietnam.

The founder of the Early Lý dynasty, Lý Bôn, was descended from Chinese refugees who fled Wang Mang's seizure of power in the final years of the Western Han in China.

The first emperor of the Lý dynasty, Lý Công Uẩn, could have his paternal bloodline traced to modern-day Fujian, China. Lý Công Uẩn's father, Lý Thuần An, escaped to Quanzhou from Hebei after Lý Công Uẩn's grandfather, Li Song, was wrongly accused of treason and executed by the Emperor Yin of Later Han.

The origin of the Trần dynasty was traced to modern Fujian, where the ancestor of the Trần imperial clan, Trần Kính, migrated from in the 11th century CE. The Later Trần dynasty was ruled by the same imperial clan as the earlier Trần dynasty.

The Hồ dynasty was ruled by the Hồ family which migrated from present-day Zhejiang, China to Vietnam under the leadership of Hồ Hưng Dật during the 10th century CE. The Hồ dynasty claimed descent from the Duke Hu of Chen, the founder of the ancient Chinese State of Chen. The Duke Hu of Chen was in turn descended from the legendary Emperor Shun, who was recognized by Hồ Quý Ly as the progenitor of the Hồ imperial family. Accordingly, the Hồ dynasty adopted the official  "" ("Great Ngu"); "Ngu" was derived from the Emperor Shun's lineage name, Youyu. Rulers of the Tây Sơn dynasty, initially surnamed , were descended from the same line as the Hồ dynasty.

Familial relations among dynasties
Several Vietnamese dynasties were related:

 Dương Vân Nga was originally an empress consort of Đinh Tiên Hoàng, the founder of the Đinh dynasty; she later became an empress consort of Lê Hoàn, the founder of the Early Lê dynasty
 Lê Thị Phất Ngân, the empress consort of Lý Thái Tổ, the founder of the Lý dynasty, was the daughter of Lê Hoàn and thus originally a princess of the Early Lê dynasty
 The final monarch of the Lý dynasty, Lý Chiêu Hoàng, was the spouse of Trần Thái Tông, the founder of the Trần dynasty
 Hồ Quý Ly, the founder of the Hồ dynasty, was the maternal grandfather of Trần An, the last emperor of the Trần dynasty
 Giản Định Đế, the founder of the Later Trần dynasty, was a son of the ninth Trần monarch, Trần Nghệ Tông; he was also an older brother of the 12th emperor of the Trần dynasty, Trần Thuận Tông
 The Primitive Lê dynasty and the Revival Lê dynasty are collectively called the Later Lê dynasty; the founder of the Revival Lê dynasty, Lê Trang Tông, was a son of Lê Chiêu Tông, the 11th Primitive Lê emperor
 The ruling house of the Tây Sơn dynasty was descended from the same paternal ancestor as the Hồ dynasty
 Gia Long Đế, the founder of the Nguyễn dynasty, was a paternal grandson of Nguyễn Phúc Khoát, the eighth Nguyễn lord

Champa

Champa existed as an independent polity until its annexation by the Nguyễn dynasty in 1832 CE, thereby laying the foundation for the territories of the modern Vietnamese state. Most of the rulers of Champa were of Cham descent, an Austronesian ethnic group distinct from the majority Kinh ethnicity of Vietnam.

There were 15 dynasties in the history of Champa. According to Chinese historical sources, Champa officially used the  "" from the 1st to 4th dynasties, "" during the 5th dynasty, and "" from the 6th to 15th dynasties.

List of dynasties in Vietnamese history
This list includes the various dynasties in the history of Vietnam, of both local and Chinese origins. Dynasties of China that ruled Vietnam are highlighted in orange. The Triệu dynasty is highlighted in light orange due to its disputed status.

Timeline of dynasties in Vietnamese history

Legend:
  denotes local Vietnamese dynasties
  denotes dynasties during the First Era of Northern Domination
  denotes dynasties during the Second Era of Northern Domination
  denotes dynasties during the Third Era of Northern Domination
  denotes dynasty during the Fourth Era of Northern Domination

See also

 Dynasty
 East Asian cultural sphere
 Emperor at home, king abroad
 Family tree of Vietnamese monarchs
 History of Vietnam
 Hua–Yi distinction
 List of historical capitals of Vietnam
 List of monarchs of Vietnam
 Little China (ideology)
 Names of Vietnam
 Northern and Southern dynasties (Vietnam)
 Sinicization
 Timeline of Vietnamese history
 Timeline of Vietnam under Chinese rule
 Vietnam under Chinese rule

Notes

References

 
 
Vietnamese